Inheritance is a 2001 Argentine drama film directed by Paula Hernández. It was entered into the 23rd Moscow International Film Festival.

Cast
 Rita Cortese as Olinda
 Adrián Witzke as Peter
 Martín Adjemián as Federico
 Julieta Díaz as Luz
 Héctor Anglada as Ángel
 Eduardo Cutuli as Tito (as Cutuli)
 Carlos Portaluppi as Raúl
 Graciela Tenenbaum as Elsa
 Ernesto Claudio as Hombre Inmobiliaria
 Damián Dreizik as Hombre Ketchup

References

External links
 

2001 films
2001 drama films
2000s Spanish-language films
Argentine drama films
2000s Argentine films